Wildsee may refer to the following lakes:

Austria
Wildsee (Seefeld), a lake near Seefeld in the Northern Limestone Alps, Tyrol
 Wildsee (Fieberbrunn), a lake in the Kitzbühel Alps near Fieberbrunn, Tyrol 

Germany
Wildsee (Kaltenbronn), a lake near Gernsbach and Bad Wildbad in the Northern Black Forest, Baden-Württemberg
Wildsee (Ruhestein), a lake near Baiersbronn in the Northern Black Forest, Baden-Württemberg

Italy
 Pragser Wildsee, a lake in the Prags Dolomites in South Tyrol

Switzerland
 Wildsee (Pizol), a lake in the Pizol area in the canton of St. Gallen

See also 
 Wildensee (disambiguation)